Joan Boughton (c. 1410s – 28 April 1494) was an English martyr.

Boughton was a widow of 80 years or more who held views associated with John Wycliffe. She was said to be the mother of a woman named Young, also suspected of following Wycliffe. She was burnt at Smithfield, London on 28 April 1494.

In Hilary Mantel's  Wolf Hall trilogy of historical novels,  Thomas Cromwell witnesses her execution as a boy. Cromwell helps the Lollards who gather remains of Boughton after the execution crowd has departed.

References

Year of birth missing
1494 deaths
Women of the Tudor period
15th-century English people
15th-century English women
People executed under Henry VII of England
Executed British people
Executed English women
People executed by the Kingdom of England by burning
15th-century executions by England
Lollard martyrs